Minapata (Spanish mina mine, Quechua pata elevated place; above, at the top; edge, bank (of a river), shore) is a mountain in the southern part of the Cordillera Blanca in the Andes of Peru, about  high . It is located in the Ancash Region, Bolognesi Province, Aquia District, and in the Recuay Province, Catac District. Minapata lies south of Challwa and northeast of Qiwllarahu.

See also 
Quñuqqucha

References

Mountains of Peru
Mountains of Ancash Region